Mannheim ARENA/Maimarkt station is a railway station in the municipality of Mannheim, located in Baden-Württemberg, Germany.

Notable places nearby
Maimarktgelände
Mannheim City Airport
Mannheim May Market
SAP Arena

References

Railway stations in Mannheim
Buildings and structures in Mannheim